Here Today is a bluegrass album by five American musicians David Grisman, Emory Gordy Jr., Herb Pedersen, Jim Buchanan and Vince Gill, released in 1983 on Rounder Records. This was the only album this group recorded and each continued separate careers in bluegrass, newgrass, and country music.

Track listing 
 "I'll Love Nobody But You" (Jesse McReynolds) – 2:04
 "Once More" (Dusty Owens) – 2:52
 "Foggy Mountain Chimes" (Earl Scruggs) – 2:27
 "The Children Are Crying" (Earl Taylor) – 2:37
 "Hot Corn, Cold Corn" (D. Ackerman, Lester Flatt, Scruggs) – 2:32
 "Lonesome River" (Carter Stanley, Ralph Stanley) – 4:07
 "My Walking Shoes" (Jimmy Martin, Paul Williams) – 2:14
 "Love and Wealth" (Ira Louvin, Charlie Louvin) – 2:33
 "Billy in the Low Ground" (Traditional) – 2:32
 "Making Plans" (Russell Morrison) – 3:57
 "Sweet Little Miss Blue Eyes" (Helm Taylor) – 1:55
 "Going up Home to Live in Green Pastures" (Avril Gearheart, Ralph Stanley) – 2:51

Personnel
David Grisman – mandolin, vocals
Jim Buchanan – fiddle, vocals
Vince Gill – guitar, vocals
Emory Gordy, Jr. – bass, vocals
Herb Pedersen – banjo, guitar, Vocals, 5-string Banjo
Production notes:
David Grisman – producer
Herb Pedersen – producer
John Haeny – engineer
Greg Fulginiti - original mastering
Dr. Toby Mountain – mastering
Neil V. Rosenberg – liner notes
Jon Sievert – photography
Craig Miller – production coordination

References

1982 albums
David Grisman albums
Vince Gill albums
Rounder Records albums